Nguyễn Quốc Thiện Esele (born as Theophilus Esele on 29 April 1984) is a former Nigerian-born Vietnamese professional footballer who last played for Nam Định as a goalkeeper.

References

1984 births
Living people
Nigerian footballers
Nigerian expatriate sportspeople in Vietnam
Naturalized citizens of Vietnam
Expatriate footballers in Vietnam
Vietnamese footballers
Vietnamese people of Nigerian descent
Association football goalkeepers
Vietnam international footballers
V.League 1 players
Becamex Binh Duong FC players